The New York Yankees are a Major League Baseball (MLB) franchise based in The Bronx, New York City, New York. They play in the American League East division.  This list consists of the owners, general managers (GMs) and other executives of the Yankees. The GM controls player transactions, hires the manager and coaching staff, and negotiates with players and agents regarding contracts.

The longest-tenured general manager in team history is Ed Barrow, who served in that role for 23 years. He was inducted in the Baseball Hall of Fame in 1953. The longest-tenured owner in team history is George Steinbrenner, who was the team's principal owner from 1973 until his death in 2010.

Principal owners

During the 1901 and 1902 seasons, the franchise played in Baltimore as the "Baltimore Orioles". They became defunct, but were purchased by William Stephen Devery and Frank J. Farrell for $18,000 and moved to New York in 1903. Jacob Ruppert and Tillinghast L'Hommedieu Huston purchased the Yankees in 1915, and Ruppert bought out Huston in 1922.

Dan Topping, Larry MacPhail, and Del Webb purchased the Yankees from Ruppert's estate in 1945. Topping and Webb forced MacPhail out of the Yankees ownership group due to his confrontational behavior after the 1947 World Series. In 1964, Topping and Webb sold the team to CBS, during which time the franchise struggled. Selling the team at a loss, CBS sold the team to a group headed by George Steinbrenner in 1973. While Steinbrenner initially owned less than half of the team, he bought out many of his partners, eventually owning 70% of the team. John McMullen, one of Steinbrenner's limited partners, said, "There is nothing in life quite so limited as being a limited partner of George Steinbrenner."

Under Steinbrenner's ownership, YankeeNets was formed after a merger of the business operations of the Yankees and New Jersey Nets. After the Nets were sold to Bruce Ratner, YankeeNets became a limited liability company (LLC) known as Yankee Global Enterprises. The LLC owns the Yankees and the YES Network. Hal Steinbrenner succeeded his father as control person of the Yankees in 2008.

General managers

Four Yankees GMs are enshrined in the National Baseball Hall of Fame: Ed Barrow, George Weiss, Larry MacPhail, and his son, Lee MacPhail. Ralph Houk, Gene Michael, Lou Piniella, and Bob Watson were former Yankees players. Houk, Michael and Piniella served as field managers for the Yankees before becoming GM.

See also

Current team executives
Randy Levine, President
 Lonn A. Trost, Esq., Chief Operating Officer and General Counsel
Damon Oppenheimer, Director of Amateur Scouting
Reggie Jackson, Special Assistant to the General Manager
Tino Martinez, Special Assistant to the General Manager 
Alex Rodriguez, Special Advisor to the General Manager 
Hideki Matsui, Special Advisor to the General Manager
Stump Merrill, Special Assistant to the General Manager

Related lists
List of New York Yankees managers
List of New York Yankees coaches

References

External links
 New York Yankees Front Office from MLB.com

Lists of Major League Baseball owners and executives
Owners and executives